Southern California Hospital at Culver City is an acute care hospital in Culver City, California.

The hospital is located in Culver City's downtown area. The hospital serves West Los Angeles;  providing 24 hour medical service. The hospital is home to the Southern California Hospital Heart Institute.

The hospital expanded from its original eight-bed clinic to 420 beds in three buildings.

History
Southern California Hospital was founded in 1925 by Dr. Foster Hull. In the 1970s, the hospital became the David Brotman Memorial Hospital. In 1984, Michael Jackson was admitted to the hospital due to a serious burn that occurred during a shoot for a Pepsi TV ad. Later, he gave his insurance payment to the hospital. That year the care unit for burn victims was named the "Michael Jackson Burn Center" in his honor. It closed in August 1987 due to financial problems.

In 2005, it became Southern California Hospital. It opened again under the leadership of Prospect Medical Holdings.

Notable employees
Tom Araya, bassist and vocalist for the American thrash metal band Slayer worked there as a respiratory therapist in the early 1980s.

References

External links
This hospital in the CA Healthcare Atlas A project by OSHPD

Hospitals in Los Angeles County, California
Buildings and structures in Culver City, California
Hospital buildings completed in 1924